The Dutch 1 guilder coin struck under the reign of  Queen Wilhelmina was a unit of currency in the Netherlands.

History
As a result of the rising silver price after the First World War, from 1922 onward it was decided that the silver content of most Dutch coins would be lowered.  Thus a new design was necessary.

Design
The design of  1 guilder coins has not changed much between 1818 and 1945.

The obverse depicts:
 Portrait of Wilhelmina facing left.
 Title of Wilhelmina: "WILHELMINA KONINGIN DER NEDERLANDEN";  Wilhelmina, queen of the Netherlands.

The reverse depicts:
  The year of mintage
  Value (1 – G).
 Privy mark (left of the coat of arms), of the director of the Utrecht-mint.
 Mint mark (right of the coat of arms) of the Utrecht-mint.
 The Crowned Dutch coat of arms.
 Country-designation: "MUNT VAN HET KONINGRIJK DER NEDERLANDEN"; Coin of the kingdom of the Netherlands.

The edge:
Plain, God be with us ("GOD ZY MET ONS")

Coins of the Netherlands
Currencies introduced in 1922
One-base-unit coins